Samaro-Ivanovka (Hamar-İvanovka) is a rural locality (a village) in Pervomaysky Selsoviet, Meleuzovsky District, Bashkortostan, Russia. The population was 320 as of 2010. There are 5 streets.

Geography 
Samaro-Ivanovka is located 12 km east of Meleuz (the district's administrative centre) by road. Uzya is the nearest rural locality.

References 

Rural localities in Meleuzovsky District